Enjoy is an Italian car sharing service provided by Eni. Enjoy is active in Milan, Turin, Rome, Florence and Bologna with a total of more than 2,000 cars. The system offers exclusively Fiat 500 and Fiat Doblò vehicles with one-way point-to-point rentals charged by the minute. Cars can be rented wherever parked via a smartphone app. From 2015 until 2017 a scooter sharing service was available utilizing Piaggio MP3 scooters

See also
Car2go and Corrente, similar car sharing systems also active in Italy.

References

External links
enjoy.eni.com - Official website

Free-floating carsharing
Eni